MIX (as Mix FM on radio) is a Malaysian national radio station managed by Astro Radio, a subsidiary of Astro Holdings Sdn Bhd. The station plays adult contemporary music from the 90s and now, targeting listeners between  the ages of 25 to 39. In 2015, as according to Nielsen RAM Survey Wave #2, Mix FM recorded an average weekly audience of 245,000.

History 
Mix alongside sister channels Hitz and Lite was among the first privately owned English language radio stations to be broadcast in Malaysia was officially launched on 1 June 1996 as Mix FM on Astro's audio-only channels since the launch of the satellite network and Mix FM was launched into Malaysian FM airwaves on New Year's Day 1997 at midnight stroke MST. The country had only one English language radio station before this, which was the government-owned Radio Malaysia Channel 4. Mix FM opening on 1 June 1996 as Adult contemporary format focusing classic hits songs mainly from the 1980s.

On January 1, 2018, the station (along with 10 other radio stations) dropped the suffix "FM" from its brand name as part of the Astro Radio’s major rebranding project to focus on digital platform. A new logo was also unveiled.

Beginning August 2021, MIX changed its radio jingles/sweepers on the radio to "Mix FM" (along with its sister stations, Hitz and Lite). Therefore, hinting that the radio station itself might go through another rebranding in the near future.

Notable announcers 
 Aishah Sinclair

Frequency

The station is also available on the Astro satellite TV service through channel 855.

^ Mix FM 91.0 MHz was unavailable in Balik Pulau and Teluk Kumbar due to adjacent channel interference from RTM Mutiara FM 90.9 MHz Bukit Genting which covers the locations, but Mix can be tuned via FM 91.3 MHz from Bukit Larut in Balik Pulau and Teluk Kumbar alternatively.

Gallery

References

External links 
 
 Mix FM listening online on Radio Malaysia.net

1996 establishments in Malaysia
Radio stations established in 1996
Radio stations in Malaysia